Ross is a census-designated place (CDP) in Ross Township, Butler County, Ohio, United States. The population was 3,417 at the 2010 census. Ross sits along U.S. Route 27 between Cincinnati, Ohio and Oxford, Ohio. Ross is part of the Cincinnati metropolitan area.

History

The settlement was laid out by Dr. Benjamin Franklin Clark on February 1, 1817, as Venus; the spelling later became corrupted as "Venice". Since there was already another post office in the state called Venice, near Lake Erie, this one was renamed in 1834 as Ross.

Geography
Ross is located along the southern border of Butler County at  (39.313606, -84.644899). To the south are the townships of Crosby and Colerain in Hamilton County, including the CDP of Dunlap in Colerain Township.

U.S. Route 27 forms the eastern edge of the CDP, leading south to Cincinnati and north to Oxford. State Routes 126 and Ohio State Route 128 run through the center of Ross as Hamilton Cleves Road. Route 126 splits off to the west toward Brookville, Indiana, while Route 128 continues southwest towards Cleves. The Great Miami River forms the southeastern edge of the CDP.

Demographics

As of the census of 2000, there were 1,971 people, 725 households, and 551 families residing in the CDP. The population density was 1,162.8 people per square mile (447.7/km). There were 753 housing units at an average density of 444.2/sq mi (171.0/km). The racial makeup of the CDP was 97.97% White, 0.20% African American, 0.36% Native American, 0.20% Asian, 0.10% from other races, and 1.17% from two or more races. Hispanic or Latino of any race were 0.61% of the population.

There were 725 households, out of which 37.8% had children under the age of 18 living with them, 58.9% were married couples living together, 12.0% had a female householder with no husband present, and 24.0% were non-families. 20.1% of all households were made up of individuals, and 8.1% had someone living alone who was 65 years of age or older. The average household size was 2.72 and the average family size was 3.13.

In the CDP, the population was spread out, with 27.1% under the age of 18, 9.3% from 18 to 24, 29.2% from 25 to 44, 22.9% from 45 to 64, and 11.5% who were 65 years of age or older. The median age was 36 years. For every 100 females, there were 93.8 males. For every 100 females age 18 and over, there were 91.3 males.

The median income for a household in the CDP was $41,429, and the median income for a family was $46,354. Males had a median income of $37,463 versus $26,167 for females. The per capita income for the CDP was $18,701. About 4.1% of families and 3.6% of the population were below the poverty line, including 6.5% of those under age 18 and none of those age 65 or over.

Economics 
Ross functions as a bedroom community northwest of Cincinnati, and includes small businesses and family-owned restaurants, serving the local community and travelers along US-27.

Education
Ross Local Schools serve the CDP proper and surrounding Ross Township. The buildings are located on three campuses and serve Kindergarten through 12th grade. The athletic teams are known as the Rams and compete in the  Southwest Ohio Conference (SWOC).

Schools 
 Morgan Elementary School
 Elda Elementary School
Ross Intermediate School
 Ross Middle School
 Ross High School

Culture 
The cultural focus of Ross is largely based on high school and community-gathering events. Community involvement and school pride are important in Ross and a major reason why the Ross Local School district is rated among the top districts in southwest Ohio.

References

Census-designated places in Butler County, Ohio
Census-designated places in Ohio
Populated places established in 1817
1817 establishments in Ohio